is a railway station in Midori-ku, Nagoya,  Aichi Prefecture, Japan, operated by Meitetsu.

Lines
Narumi Station is served by the Meitetsu Nagoya Main Line and is 55.1 kilometers from the terminus of the line at Toyohashi Station.

Station layout
The station has two elevated island platforms with the station building underneath. The station has automated ticket machines, Manaca automated turnstiles and is staffed.

Platforms

Adjacent stations

Station history
Narumi Station was opened on 8 May 1917 as a station on the Aichi Electric Railway. On 1 April 1935, the Aichi Electric Railway merged with the Nagoya Railroad (the forerunner of present-day Meitetsu). The tracks were elevated from 2004 to 2006, and a new station building was built.

Passenger statistics
In fiscal 2017, the station was used by an average of 9472 passengers daily. .

Surrounding area
 Narumi Elementary School
former Narumi Town Hall
 Narumi Jinja
Japan National Route 1

See also
 List of Railway Stations in Japan

References

External links

 Official web page 

Railway stations in Japan opened in 1917
Railway stations in Aichi Prefecture
Stations of Nagoya Railroad
Railway stations in Nagoya